The House on the Coast (German: 	Das Haus an der Küste, Serbian: Kuca na obali) is a 1954 drama film directed by Boško Kosanović and starring René Deltgen, Bert Sotlar, Nadja Regin and Sybille Schmitz. It was made as a co-production between Austria, West Germany and Yugoslavia. The film was distributed by the German branch of the Rank Organisation.

It was Schmitz's final film before her suicide the following year.

Cast
 René Deltgen as Beppo
 Bert Sotlar as Dr. Branko Illic
 Nadja Regin as Marina
 Sybille Schmitz as Anna
 Manfred Inger as Vjeko
 Eva Palmer as Davorka
 Milan Skrbinsek as Kaaapitän
 Josip Zappalorto as Ante
 Bozidar Drnic as Staatsanwalt
 Bogdan Bogdanovic as Bezirkshauptmann
 Blazo Nikolic as Bootsverkäufer
 Vasa Pantelic as Protokoll-Beamter
 Branko Stankovic as Stejpo
 Lino Sapro as Chefarzt
 Mileva Zahrajscek as Haushälterin
 Milan Rajakovic as Gefängnisbeamter

References

Bibliography 
Friedemann Beyer. Schöner als der Tod: das Leben der Sybille Schmitz. Belleville, 1998.

External links 

1954 films
1954 drama films
German drama films
Austrian drama films
Yugoslav drama films
West German films
1950s German-language films
Films directed by Bosko Kosanovic
Austrian black-and-white films
Yugoslav black-and-white films
German black-and-white films
1950s German films